Duval County, Florida (located in north-east Florida) operates a system of county roads that serve all portions of the county.

The numbers and routes of all Florida highways are assigned by the Florida Department of Transportation (FDOT), while county road numbers are assigned by the counties, with guidance from FDOT. North-south routes are generally assigned odd numbers, while east-west routes are generally assigned even numbers.

List of county roads in Duval County, Florida

See also

References

External links
FDOT Map of Duval County
. Retrieved January 2014.

 
County
Jacksonville, Florida-related lists